Kohneh Guyeh may refer to:
 Kohneh Guyeh-ye Bala
 Kohneh Guyeh-ye Pain